is a Japanese footballer currently playing as a forward or a winger for Heart of Midlothian.

Career
On 10 January 2023, Oda signed for Scottish Premiership club Heart of Midlothian for an undisclosed fee on a three-and-a-half year deal.

Career statistics

Club
.

References

External links

2001 births
Living people
Japanese footballers
Japan youth international footballers
Association football midfielders
J1 League players
Vissel Kobe players
Heart of Midlothian F.C. players
Japanese expatriate footballers
Expatriate footballers in Scotland
Japanese expatriate sportspeople in Scotland